Jean de Baie is a local service district and designated place in the Canadian province of Newfoundland and Labrador. It is near Marystown.

History 
The first post office was established in 1965 and the first postmistress was Mrs. Mary O'Keefe.

Geography 
Jean de Baie is in Newfoundland within Subdivision C of Division No. 2.

Demographics 

Government 
Jean de Baie is a local service district (LSD) that is governed by a committee responsible for the provision of certain services to the community. The chair of the LSD committee is Wayne Rogers.

See also 
List of communities in Newfoundland and Labrador
List of designated places in Newfoundland and Labrador
List of local service districts in Newfoundland and Labrador

References 

Designated places in Newfoundland and Labrador
Local service districts in Newfoundland and Labrador